Zemplén Mountains or Tokaj Mountains (or Tokaji-hegység) is a mountain range in Hungary.

Its highest peak is the Nagy-Milic at 894 metres above sea level. The range is part of the North Hungarian Mountains within the Carpathian Mountains.  Its steep peaks are the bases for many medieval stone castles, such as the castle of Sárospatak and Füzéri vár (Füzér Castle).

References

External links 

 Zempléni hegység - photos and information about Zemplén Mountains (in Czech)

Mountain ranges of Hungary
Mountain ranges of the Western Carpathians